Yang Jian (born 25 August 1981) is a Chinese rower who competed in the Men's lightweight double sculls event at the 2004 Summer Olympics. His partner was Zhu Zhifu.

References

1981 births
Living people
Rowers at the 2004 Summer Olympics
Olympic rowers of China
Rowers from Hebei
Chinese male rowers
People from Wangdu County
Sportspeople from Baoding